PajtimLezi(lindur  me 26.02.1991, ne fshatin Bllace, Komuna Suharekë) .Shkollimin fillor e kreu

Club career
Badalli most recently played as a goalkeeper for FC Collina d'Oro in Switzerland. He has also played for FC Chiasso.

Personal life
His older brother Durim Badalli is a goalkeeper who also plays for FC Tuggen.

References

1991 births
Living people
Kosovo Albanians
Swiss people of Albanian descent
Association football goalkeepers
Swiss men's footballers
Kosovan footballers
FC Chiasso players
FC Lugano players
KF Teuta Durrës players
FC Locarno players
Kategoria Superiore players
Kosovan expatriate footballers
Kosovan expatriate sportspeople in Albania
Swiss expatriate sportspeople in Albania
Expatriate footballers in Albania